Erin Popovich (born June 29, 1985) is a three-time United States Paralympic swimmer. She has won 14 career Paralympic gold medals, and 19 total.

Personal life 
Popovich was born with achondroplasia, a genetic disorder that restricted the growth of her limbs. Her parents, a teacher and a physician, moved their family to Butte, Montana when Popovich was five. During childhood, she wore braces to straighten her back and legs, and underwent about a dozen surgeries.  But according to her mother, "we didn't have to make a lot of accommodations for her; we didn't want to treat her too much differently from her siblings." Popovich was interested in sports from an early age. She rode horses and played soccer and basketball. When Popovich was 12, she joined a swim club and by the age of 15, she was competing at the 2000 Paralympic Games.

Popovich received a Bachelor of Science degree from Colorado State University in May 2007, and her hometown is listed as Silver Bow, Montana.

Swimming career 
Erin Popovich has participated in three Paralympics. She won three gold medals and three silver medals while setting four world records at the 2000 Paralympic Games in Sydney. Erin was chosen to be one of the 12,012 Torchbearers of the 2002 Winter Olympics torch relay and she carried the torch in Big Timber, Montana on Monday, January 28. At the 2004 Summer Paralympics in Athens, Popovich won seven gold medals in seven races (including two relays), and set three world records and four Paralympic Games records. In 2005, Popovich won the first ESPY Award for Best Female Athlete with a Disability and was named the Women's Sports Foundation Sportswoman of the Year. At the 2008 Summer Paralympics in Beijing, she won an additional four gold and two silver medals, breaking two world records (200m individual medley and 100m breaststroke) and two Paralympic records (100m and 400m freestyle).  In 2009, she won the ESPY Award for Best Female Athlete with a Disability for the second time.  Following the International Paralympic Committee World Swimming Championships in 2010, Popovich announced her retirement from competitive swimming.

See also
Athletes with most gold medals in one event at the Paralympic Games

References

External links 
 
 
 Erin Popovich at the U.S. Olympic & Paralympic Hall of Fame

1985 births
Living people
Sportspeople from Butte, Montana
Sportspeople from Little Rock, Arkansas
Paralympic gold medalists for the United States
Paralympic silver medalists for the United States
Swimmers at the 2000 Summer Paralympics
Swimmers at the 2004 Summer Paralympics
Swimmers at the 2008 Summer Paralympics
Paralympic swimmers of the United States
World record holders in paralympic swimming
Colorado State University alumni
Medalists at the 2000 Summer Paralympics
Medalists at the 2004 Summer Paralympics
Medalists at the 2008 Summer Paralympics
Paralympic medalists in swimming
21st-century American women
American female freestyle swimmers
American female backstroke swimmers
American female breaststroke swimmers
American female butterfly swimmers
American female medley swimmers
S6-classified Paralympic swimmers